Nationwide Airlines may refer to the following airlines:
Nationwide Airlines (South Africa), 1991--2008
Nationwide Airlines (Zambia), since 1991
Air South (Georgia), founded in 1969 as Nationwide Airlines Southeast